Adva Twil (or Tvil/Tuil, ; born 26 June 1985) is an Israeli football forward.

Club career
Twil had played in the Israeli First League since she was 15, starting in Beitar Be'er Sheva, before moving to play for Maccabi Holon, F.C. Ramat HaSharon and Maccabi Kishronot Hadera, where she had played since 2009. In 2015, Twil was loaned to F.C. Ramat HaSharon. During her club career, Twil won 2 national cups and played in the UEFA Women's Champions League with Maccabi Holon in 2003.

International career
Twil played for the national team since 2008, appearing in 30 matches. Previously, in 2003, Twil played for the U-19 national team, appearing in 3 matches.

Honours
Cup (2):
With Maccabi Holon: 2012–13
With Maccabi Kishronot Hadera: 2014–15

References

External links

1985 births
Israeli Sephardi Jews
Israeli Mizrahi Jews
Living people
Israeli women's footballers
Israel women's international footballers
Beitar Be'er Sheva F.C. (women) players
Hapoel Be'er Sheva F.C. (women) players
Maccabi Holon F.C. (women) players
F.C. Ramat HaSharon players
ASA Tel Aviv University players
Maccabi Kishronot Hadera F.C. players
Women's association football forwards
People from Yeruham